Radio 1's Dance Anthems is a radio show broadcast on BBC Radio 1 between 4pm and 7pm on Saturdays, and on BBC Radio 1 Dance between 4pm and 8pm on Saturdays. The show, which is currently presented by Charlie Hedges, plays two hours of classic dance tracks and remixes (three on BBC Radio 1 Dance) and one hour of contemporary dance tracks and remixes.

History 

Radio 1's Dance Anthems is a dance music show on BBC Radio 1, first broadcast on 26 July 1997. It was presented by Dave Pearce and was broadcast until Pearce left the station in August 2007.

In April 2012, Radio 1's Dance Anthems was revived as part of schedule changes to the station. Two shows were broadcast every week: one show was hosted by Greg James on Fridays between 6pm and 7pm, and another show was hosted by Danny Howard on Saturdays between 4pm and 7pm. The Friday show replaced Scott Mills' Ready For The Weekend when James and Mills switched shows, and Howard's Saturday show replaced Reggie Yates' show. Some of the features on Howard's Saturday show were: Danny Howard's "Future Anthem", "Push The Tempo", "All Time Dance Anthems", the "Radio 1 Dance Chart", "Trending Tracks", the "Guest Mix", the "Back 2 Back" mix and the "Victory Dance".

In November 2017, the Saturday show was taken over by MistaJam after Danny Howard started presenting a new Friday night show on BBC Radio 1. MistaJam also took over the Friday show temporarily between October and December 2017, and again between March and May 2018 whilst Greg James was presenting Sounds Like Friday Night.  MistaJam's Saturday show was divided into three parts (from November 2018, these parts were listed as separate shows). The first part, from 4pm to 5pm, played "classic" dance anthems (dance tracks and remixes that were generally more than 3 years old). The second part, from 5pm to 6pm, played "today's" dance anthems (dance tracks and remixes that were less than 18 months old). The third part, from 6pm to 7pm, played "future" dance anthems (recently released dance tracks and remixes). Features in the Future Dance Anthems part included the "Self-Certified Selection", the "R1 Dance Chart", and the "Future Mix". During MistaJam's tenure as presenter of the Saturday show, it became the most listened to on-demand programme on BBC Sounds among the under-35 demographic. As part of temporary schedule changes from March to August 2020 in the COVID-19 pandemic, the show was extended with one extra hour of classic dance anthems from 3pm to 4pm on Saturdays.

In June 2018, a further schedule change saw Greg James replaced with Scott Mills as presenter of the Friday show. One year later, in July 2019, the Friday show was rebranded Radio 1's Party Anthems.

In October 2020, Charlie Hedges took over as the presenter of Radio 1's Dance Anthems after MistaJam left BBC Radio 1 to join Capital and Capital Dance instead. The parts of the show were also changed at the same time, with two parts of Classic Dance Anthems now running from 4pm to 5pm and from 5pm to 6pm, and one part of Today's Dance Anthems running from 6pm to 7pm. An additional hour of Classic Dance Anthems also runs from 7pm to 8pm on BBC Radio 1 Dance only.

Radio 1's Party Anthems 

A spin-off show entitled Radio 1's Party Anthems is broadcast on BBC Radio 1 between 3pm and 4pm on Fridays. It is currently presented by Matt Edmondson and Mollie King and features one hour of feel-good classic and contemporary dance tracks as well as dance remixes of current popular songs.

Radio 1's Party Anthems was created in July 2019 by rebranding the Friday edition of Dance Anthems as part of the introduction of the Radio 1 Anthems series of shows, however the format of the show remains very similar to its predecessor (the only difference being that a small number of classic dance tracks are now played in addition to contemporary dance tracks and remixes). The show was originally presented by Scott Mills and broadcast between 6pm and 7pm on Fridays; however, schedule changes from September 2020 meant that the show moved to an earlier 3pm to 4pm timeslot on Fridays and was now hosted by Dev. Dev was replaced by the current presenters, Matt Edmondson and Mollie King, from January 2021 onwards after Dev left the station at the end of the previous month. From October 2022, Jamie Laing temporarily co-presented with Matt Edmondson whilst King was on maternity leave. 

Special editions of Radio 1's Party Anthems were aired on New Year's Eve from 2019 onwards, presented by Scott Mills (2019), Charlie Hedges (2019, 2022–2023), Jordan North (2019−2020, 2020−2021, 2021–2022), Arielle Free (2020), James Cusack (2021), and Charlie Tee (2022).

References

External links
 

BBC Radio 1 programmes
British music radio programmes
2019 radio programme debuts
1997 radio programme debuts